The United States ambassador to Libya is the official representative of the president of the United States to the head of state of Libya.

History
Until its independence in 1951, Libya had been a colony of Italy (1912–1947) and then under British and French occupation until 1951. In 1949 The UN General Assembly had passed a resolution stating that Libya should become independent before January 1, 1952 (Resolution 289). On December 24, 1951, Libya declared its independence under King Idris.

The United States recognized the Kingdom of Libya on December 24, 1951, in a congratulatory message sent by President Harry Truman to King Idris I. Diplomatic relations were established on the same day and the U.S. Consulate-General was elevated to a legation with Andrew Lynch designated as Charge d'Affaires ad interim. The first official envoy to Libya was Henry Serrano Villard, who presented his credentials on March 6, 1952.

On December 2, 1979, a mob attacked and burned the U.S. Embassy in Tripoli. On December 29, the U.S. Department of State designated Libya as a state sponsor of terrorism. The Chargé d’Affaires was recalled on February 8, 1980 and the embassy was closed May 2, 1980. However, diplomatic relations were not formally severed. Diplomatic relations were not resumed until 2006.

The U.S. Embassy in Tripoli was closed and all diplomatic personnel were evacuated on February 25, 2011, due to the Libyan civil war. The embassy of Hungary in Tripoli acted as the protecting power for U.S. interests from the closure of the embassy until its reopening on September 22, 2011.

On July 15, U.S. Secretary of State Clinton announced that the U.S. Government recognizes the Libyan rebel National Transitional Council as the "legitimate governing authority" of Libya—which de facto withdraws recognition from the Gaddafi government. On September 12, 2012 the US ambassador to Libya was killed in an attack on the Benghazi consulate, along with three other embassy employees.

The U.S Embassy was again evacuated and closed on July 26, 2014. Embassy staff totaling approximately 150 personnel, including about 80 U.S Marines, were evacuated overland to Tunisia during a military assisted departure. USAF F-16's provided armed overwatch for the embassy convoy as they drove through Libya. The evacuation was due to major fighting around the embassy related to the 2014 Libyan Civil War.

However, the United States did not sever diplomatic relations with Libya. Working from the U.S. Embassies in Valletta, Malta and, after August 2015, Tunis, Tunisia under the authority of the U.S. Ambassador to Libya, U.S. diplomats in the Libya External Affairs Office maintained regular dialogue with the provisional Libyan Government.

Ambassadors and chiefs of mission

Notes

See also
Libya–United States relations
Foreign relations of Libya
Ambassadors of the United States

References
United States Department of State: Background notes on Libya

External links

 United States Department of State: Chiefs of Mission for Libya
 United States Department of State: Libya
 United States Embassy in Tripoli

Libya
 
United States